Kandeh-ye Har (also known as Gandehar, Kandahar, Kand-e Har, Kandhar, and Kanhar) is a village in Harasam Rural District, Homeyl District, Eslamabad-e Gharb County, Kermanshah Province, Iran. At the 2006 census, its population was 1,399, in 320 families.

References 

Populated places in Eslamabad-e Gharb County